Marion Delbridge Moore (May 14, 1916 – August 30, 1970) professionally Del Moore, was an American actor, comedian and radio announcer.

Life and career
Moore was born on May 14, 1916, in Pensacola, Florida, he began his career in radio before moving to television. After serving in the US Army Air Forces in World War II, Moore appeared in 1952 in the first of several So You Want To ... Warner Bros. comedy shorts with George O'Hanlon. He co-starred in the early television comedy Life with Elizabeth (1953–55), with Betty White; he also was doing a morning radio spot at KMPC radio. He appeared in many episodes of Dragnet and Adam-12, and was a regular on the series Bachelor Father playing Cal Mitchell. For several years in the late 1950s he hosted a daily children's program opposite Willy the Wolf (a muppet-like adult size character), as well as hosting the Late Late Show on KTTV Channel 11 in Los Angeles.

Moore played supporting roles in several Jerry Lewis films, including The Big Mouth and The Patsy. He made his feature film debut in Lewis' Cinderfella in 1960 and was the university president in 1963's The Nutty Professor. He was also in the 1967 teen film Catalina Caper, which later appeared as an "experiment" in a 1990 episode of Mystery Science Theater 3000.

For his work on television, Del Moore received a star on the Hollywood Walk of Fame on February 8, 1960.

Moore was married twice: Jessie Newbold (m. 1937 in Florida) and Gayle Pearl Ferber (m. March 25, 1945 in California) .

Death
Moore died of a cerebral hemorrhage in Encino, California in 1970 at the age of 54. He is buried at Forest Lawn Memorial Park in Glendale, California.

Filmography

References

External links
 
Episode One of Life with Elizabeth
Del Moore with Betty White

1916 births
1970 deaths
20th-century American comedians
20th-century American male actors
United States Army personnel of World War II
American male film actors
American male television actors
Burials at Forest Lawn Memorial Park (Glendale)
Male actors from Florida
People from Pensacola, Florida
United States Army Air Forces soldiers